Ostling may refer to:
 Anders Östling, Swedish bandy player
 Maria Östling, Swedish swimmer
 Ralph Ostling (1927–2009), American politician from Michigan
 Richard and Joan Ostling, American authors and journalists
 Stig Östling, Swedish ice hockey player